Stephen Allen Schwarzman (born February 14, 1947) is an American billionaire businessman. He is the chairman and CEO of The Blackstone Group, a global private equity firm he established in 1985 with Peter G. Peterson, former chairman and CEO of Lehman Brothers and US Secretary of Commerce under President Richard Nixon. Schwarzman was briefly chairman of President Donald Trump's Strategic and Policy Forum.

Early life and education
Schwarzman was raised in a Jewish family in Huntingdon Valley, Pennsylvania, the son of Arline and Joseph Schwarzman. His father owned Schwarzman's, a former dry-goods store in Philadelphia, and was a graduate of the Wharton School.

Schwarzman's first business was a lawn-mowing operation when he was 14 years old, employing his younger twin brothers, Mark and Warren, to mow while Stephen brought in clients.

Schwarzman attended the Abington School District in suburban Philadelphia and graduated from Abington Senior High School in 1965. He attended Yale University, where he was a member of senior society Skull and Bones and founded the Davenport Ballet Society. After graduating in 1969, he briefly served in the U.S. Army Reserve before attending Harvard Business School, where he graduated in 1972.

Investment career
Schwarzman's first job in financial services was with Donaldson, Lufkin & Jenrette, an investment bank which merged with Credit Suisse in 2000. After business school, Schwarzman worked at the investment bank Lehman Brothers, became a managing director at age 31, and then head of global mergers and acquisitions. In 1985, Schwarzman and his boss, Peter Peterson, started The Blackstone Group, which initially focused on mergers and acquisitions. Blackstone would branch into business acquisition, real estate, direct lending, alternative assets, and now has some $500 billion in assets under management.

When Blackstone went public in June 2007, it revealed in a securities filing that Schwarzman had earned about $398.3 million in fiscal 2006. He ultimately received $684 million for the part of his Blackstone stake he sold in the IPO, keeping a stake then worth $9.1 billion. In the following years, his compensations increased even more: he received $350 million in 2007 and $702.4 million in 2008 - partly due to stock awards. His salary was $734.2 million in 2015, $425 US million in 2016, and $786 US million in 2017.

In June 2007, Schwarzman described his view on financial markets with the statement: "I want war, not a series of skirmishes... I always think about what will kill off the other bidder."

In September 2011, Schwarzman was listed as a member of the international advisory board of the Russian Direct Investment Fund.

Political and economic views 
Schwarzman is a Republican who favors lower taxes, lower government spending, and women's rights.

He raised $100,000 for George W. Bush's political endeavors.
In August 2010, Schwarzman compared the Obama administration's plan to raise the tax rate on carried interest to a war and Hitler's invasion of Poland in 1939, stating, "It's a war. It's like when Hitler invaded Poland in 1939." Schwarzman later apologized for the analogy. In 2012, Obama called Schwarzman and requested his assistance in brokering a budget agreement with Republicans in congress to avoid a fiscal cliff. Eventually a deal was brokered with Schwarzman's help. The new tax plan added $1 trillion of additional revenue by raising taxes, closing tax loopholes, and ending deductions. Obama later drafted a formal message of support for Schwarzman Scholars, an education initiative undertaken by Schwarzman.

He endorsed and fundraised for Mitt Romney in 2012. During the 2016 Republican primary, he declined to support any one particular candidate. He identified as center-right and said the eventual GOP nominee should appeal to independent voters, not the right wing of the Republican Party. At the same time, he had positive things to say about Hillary Clinton.

In early 2016, he said that in a two-candidate race he would prefer Donald Trump to Ted Cruz, saying that the nation needed a "cohesive, healing presidency, not one that's lurching either to the right or to the left." He had previously made a donation to Marco Rubio in 2014.

In late 2016, Schwarzman "helped put together" a team of corporate executives to advise Trump on jobs and the economy. The group, which includes JPMorgan Chase CEO Jamie Dimon, Walt Disney boss Bob Iger and former General Electric leader Jack Welch, became Trump's Strategic and Policy Forum. In February, Schwarzman was named as chair of the 16-member President's Strategic and Policy Forum, which brought together "CEOs of America's biggest corporations, banks and investment firms" to consult with the president on "how to create jobs and improve growth for the U.S. economy." On August 16, 2017, following five members' resignations, President Trump announced via Twitter he was disbanding the forum.

He is a long-time friend of former president Donald Trump and provides outside counsel, and served as chair of Trump's Strategic and Policy Forum. In response to criticism for his involvement with the Trump administration, Schwarzman penned a letter to current Schwarzman Scholars, arguing that "having influence and providing sound advice is a good thing, even if it attracts criticism or requires some sacrifice." 

In private Schwarzman called January 6 United States Capitol attack an “insurrection” and “an affront to the democratic values we hold dear". However, he stopped short of criticizing Trump over the riot.

In December 2018, non-profit consumer advocacy organisation Public Citizen published a report titled: "'Self-Funded' Trump Now Propped Up By Super PAC Megadonors." The report disclosed that Schwarzman donated $344,000 in support of Trump's re-election campaign. Following his election, Trump appointed Schwarzman as the chairman of the White House Strategic and Policy Forum.

In 2020, Schwarzman donated $15 million to the Senate Leadership Fund, a super-PAC tied to Mitch McConnell.

Wealth

According to Bloomberg Billionaires Index, he had a net worth of $32 billion as of October 2022. In 2014, Schwarzman was named as one of Bloomberg's 50 Most Influential people of the year. In 2016, Schwarzman was again named as one of Bloomberg's 50 Most Influential people of the year.

Philanthropy
In 2004, Schwarzman donated a new football stadium to Abington Senior High School—the Stephen A. Schwarzman Stadium. In 2007, Schwarzman was listed among Times 100 Most Influential People in The World.

In early 2008, Schwarzman announced that he contributed $100 million toward the expansion of the New York Public Library, for which he serves as a trustee. The central reference building on 42nd Street and Fifth Avenue was renamed The Stephen A. Schwarzman Building. In 2018, Schwarzman donated $10 million to another library, the National Library of Israel.

On April 21, 2013, Schwarzman announced a $100 million personal gift to establish and endow a scholarship program in China, Schwarzman Scholars, modeled after the Rhodes Scholarship program. Schwarzman simultaneously announced a fundraising campaign with a goal of $200 million. The Schwarzman Scholars program is housed at Tsinghua University. Since its inception, the program has maintained ties to the United Front Work Department as well as other organizations and personnel affiliated with the Chinese Communist Party.

In spring 2015, Peter Salovey, the president of Yale University, announced that Schwarzman contributed $150 million to fund a campus center in the university's historic "Commons" dining facility. Additionally, Schwarzman is also a member of the Berggruen Institute's 21st Century Council.

He has sat on the board of trustees of New York-Presbyterian Hospital since 2016.

In early 2018, it was announced that Schwarzman gave $25 million to Abington High School, his alma mater. However, this donation was contingent on several conditions, including naming rights to the school. After the public learned about the deal, a new agreement was made and Schwarzman removed several of the conditions for his donation, including renaming the school.

In October 2018, Schwarzman donated $350 million to the Massachusetts Institute of Technology to create the Schwarzman College of Computing.

In June 2019, the University of Oxford announced that Schwarzman had donated £150 million to establish the Schwarzman Centre for the Humanities, due to be completed for the university's 2024–25 academic year.

Schwarzman announced in February 2020 that he had signed The Giving Pledge, committing to give the majority of his wealth to philanthropic causes.

In October 2020, Schwarzman pledged to give $8 million to the USA Track and Field Foundation in the runup to the 2021 Tokyo and 2024 Paris Olympics.

In December 2021, Schwarzman and his wife Christine gave $25 million to the Animal Medical Center of New York in New York City. The hospital was renamed The Stephen and Christine Schwarzman Animal Medical Center.

Personal life
Schwarzman married his first wife Ellen Philips in 1971, a trustee of Northwestern University and the Mount Sinai Medical Center. They had two children: film producer Teddy Schwarzman and writer and podcaster Zibby Owens. They divorced in 1990. 

Schwarzman married his second wife Christine Hearst in 1995, an intellectual property lawyer who grew up on Long Island, New York. She has one child from a previous marriage.

He lives in a duplex apartment at 740 Park Avenue previously owned by John D. Rockefeller Jr. Schwarzman purchased the apartment from Saul Steinberg. He spent millions of dollars on both his sixtieth and seventieth birthday parties.

In 2011, The Wall Street Journal reported on the vast water consumption of wealthy Palm Beach residents during exceptional drought conditions. Schwarzman was listed as a top-five water user, having consumed 7,409,688 gallons between June 2010 and May 2011. The average Palm Beach resident consumes 108,000 gallons per year.

Other
In 1999, Schwarzman received the American Academy of Achievement's Golden Plate Award.

Schwarzman has been an adjunct professor at the Yale School of Management and was chairman of the board of trustees of the John F. Kennedy Center for the Performing Arts from 2004 to 2010.

In December 2018, Schwarzman was awarded the Order of the Aztec Eagle, Mexico's highest honor for foreigners, by President Enrique Peña Nieto in recognition of Schwarzman's work on behalf of the U.S. in support of the U.S.-Mexico-Canada Agreement.

In 2019, Schwarzman wrote his first book titled, What It Takes: Lessons in the Pursuit of Excellence, "which draws from his experiences in business, philanthropy and public service." His book became a New York Times Best Seller. However, the title was included with a dagger next to it, used to indicate that retailers reported receiving bulk purchases.

See also 

 Hamilton E. James
 Park Avenue: Money, Power and the American Dream, a documentary about the wealth gap that refers to Schwarzman.

References

Further reading
 King of Capital: The Remarkable Rise, Fall, and Rise Again of Steve Schwarzman and Blackstone.
Greed and Glory on Wall Street—The Fall of the House of Lehman by Ken Auletta, The Overlook Press, New York,

External links
 

1947 births
Living people
20th-century American businesspeople
21st-century American businesspeople
21st-century philanthropists
American billionaires
American chairpersons of corporations
American chief executives of financial services companies
American financial company founders
American financiers
American investment bankers
American investors
American money managers
American philanthropists
Benefactors of Yale University
Businesspeople from Pennsylvania
Chief executives in the finance industry
Harvard Business School alumni
Jewish American philanthropists
Lehman Brothers people
New York (state) Republicans
People from Montgomery County, Pennsylvania
Private equity and venture capital investors
Stock and commodity market managers
The Blackstone Group people
Yale College alumni
Yale School of Management faculty
People named in the Paradise Papers
21st-century American Jews